Apertotemporalis was an extinct genus of bothremydid turtle that lived during the Late Cretaceous. The type species A. baharijensis was named in 1934 by Ernst Stromer for a specimen, NR 1912 VIII 93, consisting only of a fragmentary skull destroyed on the night of April 23/24, 1944, during World War II. No more remains have been found since. The specimen was found in the Bahariya Formation of Egypt.

References 

Fossil taxa described in 1934
 
Prehistoric turtle genera